Leo Rutman is an American author and playwright. His novels are generally set in New York City during the twentieth century.

Rutman has received playwriting awards from Yale University, Brandeis University, and Columbia University. His published and produced plays include They Got Jack, Jesus is a Junkie, and Where is Che Guevara?.

Bibliography 
 Five Good Boys (1982)
 Spear of Destiny (1988)
 Clash of Eagles (1990)
 Thy Father's Son (2002)

20th-century American novelists
21st-century American novelists
American male novelists
Living people
20th-century American male writers
21st-century American male writers
Year of birth missing (living people)